William B. Colleary, AIA, (September 26, 1890 – August 18, 1973) was an American architect active in the first half of the twentieth century. He practiced in Boston, Massachusetts, and was a partner in the architectural firm of Sheehan & Colleary and later William B. Colleary, both of which were responsible for the design of many Roman Catholic Church churches, schools, rectories, and convents.

Early life and education
Colleary was born 1890 in Boston and grew up in the Forest Hills section of Boston. He attended the College of the Holy Cross, Worcester, MA (class of 1913). He then continued his studies at MIT (class of 1917).

Early career
During his time at MIT, he was briefly employed by the firm of Maginnis and Walsh.  While there, he earned several awards including a prize from the Boston Society of Architects and the gold medal from the Societe des Architectes Diplomes par le Gouvernement Francais.

Colleary served as an ensign in the United States Navy during World War 1.

Architectural practice
In 1920, he entered into a partnership with T. Edward Sheehan, which was known as Sheehan and Colleary.  After Sheehan's death Colleary continued to practice under his own name.

Works 
St. Ann Church,  Quincy, MA
St. Michael Church,  North Andover, MA
St. James Church, Arlington, MA
St. Catherine Church, Westford, MA
St. Mary Church, Wrentham, MA
St. James Church, Groton, MA
St. Joseph Church,  Portland, ME
St. Mary Church, Randolph, MA (basement only, superstructure completed by another architect)
Rectory of St. John the Evangelist Church, Cambridge, MA

Works attributed to Colleary
Our Lady of Perpetual Help Church, Bradford, VT

References

External links
Mention of William B. Colleary's death

1890 births
1973 deaths
20th-century American architects
American ecclesiastical architects
Architects of Roman Catholic churches
Architects from Boston
Massachusetts Institute of Technology alumni
College of the Holy Cross alumni